Lysimachus is an ancient and modern Greek name meaning "scattering the battle". The female equivalent of the name is Lysimache.

The name may refer to:
 Lysimachus the father of the Athenian politician Aristides the Just who had a grandson of the same name through Aristides
 Lysimachus of Acarnania, second tutor of Alexander of Great
 Lysimachus, a general who was a somatophylax of Alexander the Great and later King of Thrace, Macedonia and Asia Minor. Other members of his family include:
 his son, Lysimachus, one of the sons from his third wife Arsinoe II
 his grandson, Lysimachus of Egypt, one of the sons of Ptolemy II Philadelphus from his first wife Arsinoe I, who was one of the daughters of Lysimachus
 his other grandson, Lysimachus of Telmessos, first son of Ptolemy I Epigone who was the first son of Lysimachus from his third wife Arsinoe II
 his great-grandson, Lysimachus one of the sons of Berenice II and Ptolemy III Euergetes who was a brother of Lysimachus of Egypt
 Lysimachus, a physician from the Greek island of Kos
 Lysimachus, a comic poet of Old Comedy
 Lysimachus of Alexandria, 1st century BCE, grammarian from Alexandria of Ancient Egypt
 Lysimachus, the brother of High Priest Menelaus.
 Lysimachus, the translator of Greek version of the book of Esther.
 Lysimachus, a King of Sicily whom the Lysimachia, a genus of flowering plants, was named after
 Lysimachus, fictional governor of Mytilene in Shakespeare's Pericles, Prince of Tyre
 Lysimachia, a city in Thrace founded by Lysimachus, King of Thrace, Macedonia and Asia Minor